The Johannesburg East Reformed Church was a congregation of the Dutch Reformed Church in South Africa (NGK) in the Johannesburg suburb of Doornfontein, just east of downtown. It is also known as the Irene Church after the sobriquet of its second and third churches on 1 Beit Street. Five weeks before its centennial (July 8, 1997), on June 1, 1997, Johannesburg East was absorbed by the Johannesburg Reformed Church (NGK), from whence it had seceded on July 8, 1897.

Origins 
The influx of people to the Witwatersrand in the wake of the discovery of gold there in 1886 became too much for the Rev. N. J. van Warmelo and the church council of the Heidelberg Reformed Church (NGK) to handle. The first NGK service in Johannesburg was held in the middle of that year outdoors by a willow near where the Abraham Kriel Children’s Home and the Langlaagte Reformed Church building would later stand.

It was a proponent from the Du Toit's Pan Reformed Church near Kimberley, Rev. J.N. Martins, who would come to the boomtown to “preach the dear Gospel to our brothers in the gold fields.”

The city grew quickly and a series of suburbs began to form, including Hillbrow (to the east), Mayfair (to the west, later home to the Mayfair Reformed Church), Rosebank (to the north), and Rosettenville (to the south). When Johannes de Villiers was appointed the first mayor of Johannesburg in 1897, the city was already home to 100,000, half of them white (mainly English-speakers and Russian Jews) and in some areas numbering 24 men for every woman. There were 591 hotels within city limits, and almost as many brothels.

The Church grew apace, and by the outbreak of the Second Boer War in 1899, the following congregations had all arisen on the Rand: Langlaagte (1892), Boksburg (1894), Fordsburg (1896), Jeppestown and Johannesburg East (both on Thursday, July 8, 1897), and Germiston (1899). Only one of these first six NGK churches on the Rand remained by 2012, Johannesburg proper, with 60 members (according to the NGK Yearbook) after Boksburg’s less than 100 members joined Boksburg South by the end of 2011.

Growth 
The first pastor of Johannesburg East, Rev. Pieter Gerhardus Jacobus Meiring (1897-1904), came to town around 1895 as a curate to serve the growing downtown portion of the mother church. Forty members signed a petition calling for the downtown and areas just to the east to secede, including Harry J. Hofmeyr (later mayor of Johannesburg and vice-chancellor of the University of the Witwatersrand), Lourens Geldenhuys, P. van Os (first secretary of the congregation), O.J.J. van Wyk (its first cashier), C.L. Neethling, and J. van Eyssen. The first verger was P.J. Preller. Among the most prominent names on the list was that of a young prosecutor named Jan Smuts, who had settled with his wife shortly earlier in a humble dwelling on Twist Street.

At first, Johannesburg East used the mother church’s building on Von Brandis Square, but the latter’s sale forced other arrangements. For the time being, the congregation used the Freemasons’ Hall on Plein Street. However, on September 4, 1898, they were able to move into their first dedicated church, a hall on plots 346 and 347 on the corner of Hol (now Edith Cavell Street) and Plein Streets, part of the mother church’s provisions. Mayor De Villiers had laid the cornerstone on Saturday, May 7, 1898, of what would later be called “Irene Hall.” The Boer War and World War I would try the congregation, but finances recovered by the early 1920s.

Members moving northward 
By 1926, the growth of Johannesburg’s northern suburbs had shifted the congregation’s center of gravity away from the Irene Hall, prompting decisions to move the place of worship with it. The noisy tram and motorcycle traffic and omnipresent dust from mine tailings discouraged moving the building for the time being. In the end, the church council decided to instead build a church among the rising apartment blocks in the Hillbrow area.

On November 21, 1929, the council members officially approved construction and started a fund for the purpose, which raised £4,370 in ten months. The cornerstone was laid on June 11, 1932 and from Friday to Sunday, March 3–5, 1933, the first official Irene Church and its outbuildings, costing £13,000 (including the pulpit, the pews, and the second organ), was inaugurated.

This church would serve the congregation for 38 years, but in 1968, the council assigned O.H. Oosthuizen & Associates to design a replacement, the plans for which were approved by the middle of the year. The congregation bought the land for R93,000 and sold the old Irene Church in January 1969, but construction on the new one did not begin until April 1970. The cornerstone was laid on August 8, 1970, and the last services were held in the old church on January 31, 1971. The final cost of the new Irene Church, including the organ built by Erwin Fehrle on a design by Walter Supper of Esslingen am Neckar, Germany, was R280,000. The building opened midday on March 4, 1972, followed by an evening concert using the largest organ in the local NGK at 2,407 pipes.

Secessions and reabsorptions 
Five congregations would secede over the years from Johannesburg East: Turffontein (in 1906, including part of Jeppestown as well), Johannesburg North (in 1942, including parts of the original Johannesburg, using a hall in Orchards built by Johannesburg East in 1905), Parkhurst (in 1944, including more parts of Johannesburg), and Johannesburg-Observatory (in 1964, served by Rev. Hendrik Snijders as its first pastor). As Observatory grew empty of Afrikaners, the local congregation was absorbed by Johannesburg North. Parkhurst and Parkhurst merged into Parkkruin Reformed Church in the 1990s, while Turffontein merged with Johannesburg South Reformed Church (NGK) in 1994 to form Deo Gloria Reformed Church. In 1992, Jeppestown similarly merged with its daughter churches (Malvern Reformed Church, Bezuidenhout Valley Reformed Church, and Belgravia Reformed Church) to form Kensington Reformed Church.

Social environment 
For over fifty years, the NGK in Johannesburg made a coordinated effort to alleviate the spiritual and material poverty of the local Afrikaners. In 1937, the Nederduitse Hervormde of Gereformeerde Kerk (as the Transvaal NGK was called until 1957) founded an organization known Randse Armsorgraad (Caring Arms on the Rand). In 1944, the Johannesburg East church council counted 7,824 families in need of assistance, and the organization was already the leading social welfare charity on the Rand. Post-World War II economic growth began to alleviate poverty, homelessness, and unemployment among Johannesburg Afrikaners, but the February 23, 1945 issue of the Irenenuus stated that between 450 and 500 people in the congregation still received alms.  The article attributed the poverty to causes such as alcoholism, illness, bereavement, divorce, unemployment, fornication, sloth, and mental illness. On September 10, 1941, the Irenenuus quoted Mrs. T. Vermeulen, a Johannesburg East social worker, as saying poverty itself was less their enemy than the abuse and bootlegging of liquor. The council’s congregation religious report for July 1944 to June 1945 attributed an uptick in the misery to wartime conditions.

Evangelism 
In the late 1950s, the NGK began focusing more heavily on the mission. From September 28–30, 1959, Rev. P.S.Z. Coetzee chaired a national conference in Bloemfontein on “the [NGK] and its Evangelist mission today,” attended by 102 pastors from the Southern Transvaal Synod (currently the Highveld Synod). The northern Transvaal Synod had already begun hiring missionary pastors and workers as early as 1957, but it was only a year after the conference that the South Transvaal one hired its first four missionaries to work in downtown Johannesburg. The Synod Mission Committee reported at the March 1963 Synod Conference: “early results from Mission work downtown point to the need for more staffing downtown to do the pastoral work. Downtown preaching revealed hundreds among the city’s population simply disappearing.” The report continued to reveal that “one of the congregations,” namely Johannesburg-Braamfontein (the main Johannesburg one), “found halfway through its pastoral care efforts that 653 unchurched people came in, to say nothing of 627 who went to church but did not know the council.” The situation was exacerbating, and neither Johannesburg nor Johannesburg-East had the staff to keep up with demand.

Both congregations hired a pastor and a lay worker each solely devoted to mission work between 1960 and 1962. In Johannesburg East, Rev. G.F.K. Carstens served from October 1960 to August 1962, succeeded in February 1963 by Rev. A.J. Pienaar. Meanwhile, starting in January 1961, Mrs. A. Nieuwoudt served as lay missionary. In the first three wards where Rev. Carstens worked, he visited 104 NGK members unknown to the council and 98 non-members of the church itself. Of the 98 outsiders, he catechized, took confession from, and baptized 27. In her first two years since appointment by the Synod, Nieuwoudt found 345 extra NGK members and visited 117 non-members.

Famed pastors 
The first pastor, Rev. Meiring, later became pastor of the Rondebosch Reformed Church and editor of the magazine Kerkbode. He was also the father of Arnold Meiring, a subsequent pastor of Rondebosch.

In 1913, Rev. (later Dr.) William Nicol was invested in the congregation. Dr. Paul du Plessis wrote in his 1993 D.D. thesis that:

In Johannesburg, the Afrikaner had to fight for spiritual survival. The Church, namely the Dutch Reformed Church in South Africa, was closely involved in this struggle, members and ecclesiasts alike. The church bound them together and offered them security. Nicol’s arrival in the Gold City in 1913 dragged him into this struggle when he realized that the Afrikaner, the church, and especially his Lord, called him to evangelize and to assist man in his distress.

Nicol founded the congregation’s newsletter, the Irenenuus, in January 1923, to spiritually advise parishioners. It was written in Afrikaans at a time when the language was just gaining a foothold in the schools and was seldom heard from the pulpit, and would continue to be published until a few years before the congregation’s incorporation into the Johannesburg one. Around August 1923, Rev. Nicol gave the first sermon in Afrikaans to be broadcast on the radio live in the downtown studios. On Sunday, June 7, 1924, at 7:45 PM, a full service would be broadcast for the first time direct from Irene Hall to SABC listeners nationwide, followed on October 4, 1925 by the first such relay of a Communion service. On August 28, 1933, Rev. R.J. de L. Theron of the Alberton Reformed Church announced the publication of the first Afrikaans Bible on radio from that same church.

The Rev. Nicol was also an innovator in his congregation. The use of communion bowls rather than cups during the Spanish flu was reported by Du Plessis as his “practical approach.” There was also a Weekly Freewill Offering, in which members were prompted to bring weekly Thanksgiving offerings to teach them biblical gratitude toward their Lord.” The Rev. Nicol left in June 1938 for Pretoria East.

His successor, Rev. Arnold Meiring, would be equally well-known for his role as moderator of the Transvaal Synods from 1957 to 1961. He served for 13 years in Johannesburg and left in September 1951 for Heidelberg and finished his ministry in Pretoria East like his predecessor.

Absorption 
In the wake of apartheid’s dismantling in the 1990s, whites left downtown and surrounding areas that had long been called “grey.” Therefore, Johannesburg East’s membership shrunk from 1,647 in 1985 and 1,557 in 1990 to 384 in 1994 and 313 in 1995.

On Thursday, June 1, 1995, the Auckland Park Reformed Church (then serving about 550 members and 1,700 students) was absorbed by the Johannesburg congregation, which by then had dwindled to barely over a 100 members. Two years later, on Sunday, June 1, 1997, the enlarged Johannesburg congregation absorbed Johannesburg East as well. The headquarters was moved to Auckland Park, with services continuing to be held in Braamfontein and the Irene Church.

The resulting congregation had four pastors: Rev. Johan Krige (student pastor of Auckland Park since January 8, 1982, later CEO of MES), Rev. Christoph Müller (suburbs), and Revs. Attie Botha and Piet Smith (downtown). The congregation stretched from Ellis Park in the east to Rand Afrikaans University (now the University of Johannesburg) in the west, and Revs. Botha and Smith ministered to many non-members downtown.

Although the Melville Reformed Church approached Auckland Park about mergers (Melville’s membership was just 340 in 1994), Melville and the Braamfontein/Irene portions of the district did not come to an agreement. The constituent parts of the Johannesburg congregation split when, around 2000, the Auckland Park church sold the Kingway buildings to a gas station developer, which along with disagreements surrounding Rev. Botha’s dismissal led the area to join Melville as the Melville Cross Reformed Church, worshiping from the Melville church on 51 4th Avenue.

This left the Johannesburg Reformed Church with 60 adult members. The Highveld Synod made its long-awaited move out of the Synod Headquarters at 117 De Korte Street in 2009, setting up 18 offices in the parsonage and other buildings of the Kempton Park South Reformed Church at 56 Gladiator Street, Rhodesfield, closer to the center of the synod and more of the remaining members. Kempton Park South continues to use the church to serve less than 30 members, while the few Johannesburg members used the Irene Church. The Rev. Piet Smith (who died on November 3, 2010) was student pastor of Auckland Park starting in 1982, but served Auckland Park, Melville after their merger, and Johannesburg, both the congregations and surrounding residents and homeless, until his 2008 retirement. The congregation remained vacant from then on, although Rev. Smith served as pastoral help until his death. He had also become involved in MES in 1998 and served as a director for it from January 2004.

Today 
Today, the Irene Church is home to five congregations since the Johannesburg congregation donated it to Metropolitan Evangelical Services (MES Action) around 2000. Every Sunday the following services are held: at 9:00 AM by the NGK in Afrikaans and English, at 10:30 by the Soul Saving Bible Church in English and the Early Church of Revival in French, at 2:00 PM by the NGK in Portuguese, and at 3:00 by the United Reformed Church in Southern Africa in Zulu and Sotho.

Location 
The church is on 1 Beit Street in Doornfontein.

Select pastors 
 Pieter Gerhardus Jacobus Meiring, 1897–1904.
 Dr. H.A. Lamprecht, 1905–1912.
 William Nicol, August 8, 1913 – June 1938, later administrator of Transvaal for 10 years.
 Dr. J.H. Kritzinger, curate around 1937
 Arnold Meiring, 1938–1951.
 Jozua Johannes Georg Loots, 1939–1941.
 Hendrik Johannes Piek, 1942–1949.
 Pieter Louis Rossouw, 1949–1954.
 Jacobus Francois Myburgh, 1952–1957.
 Adriaan (Attie) Johan Victor Burger, 1955–1957 (later editor of Die Voorligter until 1967).
 Dr. Louis Viljoen Rex, 1957–1959 (died in office).
 Dr. Benjamin Engelbrecht, 1957–1965 (after NGK service editor of Pro Veritate, the newsletter of the Beyers Naudé's Christian Institute of Southern Africa; returned to the ministry in 1988).
 George Frederik Kellerman Carstens, 1960–1962 (mission).
 Dr. Petrus Cornelius Cloete, 1961–1962.
 Hendrik Johannes Christoffel Snijders, 1962–1964 (first pastor of Johannesburg-Observatory after its separation from Johannesburg East).
 Andries Jacobus Pienaar, 1962–1967 (mission)
 Willie Jonker, 1966–1968 (also an author and from 1971 to 1992 a professor of divinities in the U.S.).
 Daniël Fredrick Killian, June 3, 1967 – 1970.
 Christoffel Johannes Botha, 1968–1973.
 Julian Cornelius Müller, 1971–1975.
 Septimus Boshoff, 1971–1974.
 Wilhelmus Cornelis Goosen, 1974 – May 1978 (became a student pastor in Aucklandpark).
 Pieter Ernst Scholtz Smith, February 7, 1976 – 1982.
 Marthinus Theunis Steyn Fourie, January 12, 1979 – 1986.
 Jacobus de Wet Brits, 1983–1992 (from the ministry).
 Arthur Daniel (Attie) Botha, 1994–1997 (after the merger pastor of Johannesburg until 2001).

Sources 
 Albertyn, J.R. (chairman) (1947). Kerk en stad. Stellenbosch: Pro Ecclesia-Boekhandel.
 Bulpin, T.V. (2001). Discovering Southern Africa. Cape Town: Discovering Southern Africa Publications cc.
 Dreyer, Rev. A. (1924). Eeuwfeest-Album van de Nederduits Gereformeerde-Kerk in Zuid-Afrika 1824–1924. Cape Town: Publikatie-kommissie van de Z.A. Bijbelvereniging.
 Hofmeyr, George (chief ed.) (2002). NG Kerk 350. Wellington: Lux Verbi.BM.
 MES home page
 Minutes of the Fourth Conference of the South Transvaal Synod of the NGK, Pretoria, March 26–27, 1963.
 Olivier, Rev. P.L.(compiler) (1952). Ons gemeentelike feesalbum. Cape Town/Pretoria: N.G. Kerk-uitgewers.
 Smit, Rev. A.P. (1948). Ons Kerk in die Goudstad (1887–1947). Cape Town: Church councils of Johannesburg, Fordsburg, Johannesburg East, and Jeppestown.
 Stals, Prof. Dr. E.L.P. (ed.) (1986). Afrikaners in die Goudstad: vol. 2. 1924–1961. Pretoria: HAUM Opvoedkundige Uitgewery.

External links 
 MES at 20 Years Old. URL accessed 23 October 2019.
 Church location on 1 Beit Street from Google Maps. URL accessed 23 October 2019.
 The area where Irene Hall was and later the site of the first Irene Church, on the corner of Plein and Edith Cavell Streets. URL accessed 23 October 2019.

References 

Churches in Johannesburg
Protestantism in South Africa
Dutch Reformed Church in South Africa (NGK)